BCSS may refer to:

Schools and schooling
Secondary schools
 Bear Creek Secondary School, a high school located in Barrie, Ontario, Canada
 Bernie Custis Secondary School, a high school located in Hamilton, Ontario, Canada
 Bill Crothers Secondary School, a high school located in Markham, Canada
 Boundary Central Secondary School, a high school in Midway, British Columbia
 Brampton Centennial Secondary School, a high school in Brampton, Ontario

Schooling
 British Columbia School Sports
 Bergen County Special Services School District, a school district in Bergen County, New Jersey
 Buford City School System, aka, Buford City School District, Gwinnett County, Georgia

Other uses
 Behavioral change support system
 between-cluster sum of squares, in K-means clustering
 Bigelow Commercial Space Station
 Bihar Chhatra Sangharsh Samiti, one of the organizations in the Bihar Movement
 British Cactus & Succulent Society
 British Columbia Sheriff Service
 Business Class Services Specialist, see List of professional designations in the United States

See also 

 BCSS Namur
 BCS (disambiguation)